The Jacksonville State–Samford football rivalry is an American college football rivalry between the Jacksonville State Gamecocks and Samford Bulldogs. The two schools are located 80 miles apart from each other in eastern Alabama.

History
The two teams first met on the football field in 1905, and have met 47 times since then. Jacksonville State currently leads the series 23–21–3.

Game results

See also  
 List of NCAA college football rivalry games

References

College football rivalries in the United States
Jacksonville State Gamecocks football
Samford Bulldogs football
1905 establishments in Alabama